K. K. Singh (died 2011) was an Indian screenwriter and has film director-producer credits for Veergati and actor credits for Sham Ghansham. Singh had written scripts primarily for Bollywood films and has worked in a regional-language Bhojpuri film "Aulaad" directed by Aslam Sheikh. He debuted in Hindi-language films in 1982, with Raj Kapoor's film Prem Rog as an assistant director, and was honoured with several awards including Filmfare Award for Best Dialogue and Filmfare Award for Best Story writer.

Life and background 
Singh was initially working in Hindi cinema  as an additional dialogue writer. His first film as a writer and assistant director was Raj Kapoor's Prem Rog. After making his debut in Bollywood, he then worked in Veergati as a producer and director, starring Salman Khan. It was 1998 when he worked as an actor in Sham Ghansham film director by Ashok Ghai.

Awards
He has written over 25 films including Raj Kapoor's last film Ram Teri Ganga Maili. Filmfare Award for Best Dialogue and Filmfare Award for Best Story were conferred to him during 40th Filmfare Awards held in 1995 for the film Krantiveer.

Filmography

References

External links 

K. K. Singh on BollywoodMDB

Indian screenwriters
2011 deaths
Hindi-language film directors
Filmfare Awards winners